Mulhouse (or  ;  ; meaning "mill house") is a city of the European Collectivity of Alsace (formerly Haut-Rhin department, in the Grand Est region of France), close to the Swiss and German borders. It is the largest city in Haut-Rhin and second largest in Alsace after Strasbourg.

An industrial town nicknamed "the French Manchester", Mulhouse is also the main seat of the Upper Alsace University, where the secretariat of the European Physical Society is found.

Administration
Mulhouse is a commune with a population of 108,312 in 2019. This commune is part of an urban unit also named Mulhouse with 247,065 inhabitants in 2018.

Mulhouse commune is a subprefecture, the administrative centre of the Arrondissement of Mulhouse. It is one of the most populated sub-prefectures in France.

History

In 58 BC a battle took place west of Mulhouse and opposed the Roman army of Julius Caesar by a coalition of Germans led by Ariovistus. The first written records of the town date from the twelfth century. It was part of the southern Alsatian county of Sundgau in the Holy Roman Empire. From 1354 to 1515, Mulhouse was part of the Décapole, an association of ten Free Imperial Cities in Alsace. The city joined the Swiss Confederation as an associate in 1515 and was therefore not annexed by France in the Peace of Westphalia in 1648 like the rest of the Sundgau. An enclave in Alsace, it was a free and independent Calvinist republic, known as Stadtrepublik Mülhausen, associated with the Swiss Confederation until, after a vote by its citizens on 4 January 1798, it became a part of France in the Treaty of Mulhouse signed on 28 January 1798, during the Directory period of the French Revolution.

Starting in the middle of the eighteenth century, the Koechlin family pioneered cotton cloth manufacturing; Mulhouse became one of France's leading textile centers in the nineteenth century. André Koechlin (1789–1875) built machinery and started making railroad equipment in 1842. The firm in 1839 already employed 1,800 people. It was one of the six large French locomotive constructors until the merger with Elsässische Maschinenbau-Gesellschaft Grafenstaden in 1872, when the company became Société Alsacienne de Constructions Mécaniques.

After the Prussian victory in the Franco-Prussian War (1870–1871), Mulhouse was annexed to the German Empire as part of the territory of Alsace-Lorraine (1871–1918). The city was briefly occupied by French troops on 8 August 1914 at the start of World War I, but they were forced to withdraw two days later in the Battle of Mulhouse.  Alsatians who celebrated the appearance of the French army were left to face German reprisals, with several citizens sentenced to death. After World War I ended in 1918, French troops entered Alsace, and Germany ceded the region to France under the Treaty of Versailles.  After the Battle of France in 1940, it was occupied by German forces until its return to French control at the end of World War II in May 1945.

The town's development was stimulated first by the expansion of the textile industry and tanning, and subsequently by chemical and Engineering industries from the mid 18th century. Mulhouse was for a long time called the French Manchester. Consequently, the town has enduring links with Louisiana, from which it imported cotton, and also with the Levant. The town's history also explains why its centre is relatively small.

Geography
Two rivers run through Mulhouse, the Doller and the Ill, both tributaries of the Rhine. It lies close enough to Basel, Switzerland and Freiburg, Germany to share the EuroAirPort international airport with these two cities.

Districts
Medieval Mulhouse consists essentially of a lower and an upper town.
The lower town was formerly the inner city district of merchants and craftsmen. It developed around the Place de la Réunion (which commemorates its reunion with France). Nowadays this area is pedestrianised.
The upper town developed from the eighteenth century on. Previously, several monastic orders were established there, notably the Franciscans, Augustinians, Poor Clares and Knights of Malta.
The Nouveau Quartier (New District) is the best example of urban planning in Mulhouse, and was developed from 1826 on, after the town walls had been torn down (as they were in many towns in France). It is focused around the Place de la République. Its network of streets and its triangular shape are a good demonstration of the town's desire for a planned layout. The planning was undertaken by the architects G. Stolz and Félix Fries. This inner city district was occupied by rich families and the owners of local industries, who tended to be liberal and republican in their opinions.
The Rebberg district consists of grand houses inspired by the colonnaded residences of Louisiana cotton planters. Originally, this was the town's vineyard (the word Rebe meaning vine in German). The houses here were built as terraces in the English style, a result of the town's close relationship with Manchester, where the sons of industrialists were often sent to study.

Climate
Mulhouse's climate is temperate oceanic (Köppen: Cfb), but its location further away from the ocean gives the city colder winters with some snow, and often hot and humid summers, in comparison with the rest of France.

Population

The population data in the table and graph below refer to the commune of Mulhouse proper, in its geography at the given years. The commune of Mulhouse absorbed the former commune of Dornach in 1914 and Bourtzwiller in 1947.

Main sights

 Hôtel de Ville (1552). The town hall was built in 1553 in the Rhenish Renaissance style. Montaigne described it as a "palais magnifique et tout doré" ("splendid golden palace") in 1580. It is known for its trompe-l'œil paintings, and its pictures of allegories representing the vices and virtues.
 Workers' quarter (mid 19th century), inspired workers' quarters in many other industrial towns.
 Place de la Bourse and the building of the Société Industrielle de Mulhouse, in the Nouveau Quartier (19th century)
 Cité de l'Automobile (featuring the Schlumpf collection)
 Cité du Train successor to Musée Français du Chemin de Fer (French National Railway Museum)
 Museum of Electricity (Electropolis)
 Musée des Beaux-Arts (Fine Arts Museum)
 Musée historique (History Museum, located in th Hôtel de Ville
 Museum of Printed Textiles (Musée de l'impression sur étoffes)
 The Parc Zoologique et Botanique de Mulhouse (botanical garden and zoo)
 Saint-Steffen Calvinist temple (1859–1869), by Jean-Baptiste Schacre

Principal economic activities

As early as the mid-19th century, Mulhouse was known as "the industrial capital of Alsace", the "city with a hundred chimneys" (cité aux cent cheminées) and "the French Manchester".

 Automobile industry (Peugeot's Mulhouse factory is the largest employer in Alsace)
 Chemical industry (ICMD)
 Electronics (Clemessy)
 Engineering (SACM – Wärtsilä)

Between 1909 and 1914 there was an aircraft manufacturer, Aviatik, in Mulhouse.

Education 
The École nationale supérieure de chimie de Mulhouse, the first school of Chemistry in France, is located in the city.

Transport

Air

Rail
Gare de Mulhouse is well connected with the rest of France by train, including major destinations such as Paris, Dijon, Besançon, Belfort, Strasbourg, Lyon, Marseille, Montpellier and Lille. Some trains operate to destinations in Switzerland, in particular proximity Basel, Bern and Zürich. There is also a train service to Frankfurt am Main in Germany, and a Eurocity service that connects Brussels, Luxembourg, Strasbourg and Basel calls at Mulhouse.

Regional services connect Mulhouse to Colmar, Strasbourg, Basel, Belfort, Kruth and Freiburg im Breisgau.

Urban transport
Transport within Mulhouse is provided by Soléa and comprises a network of buses together with the city's tram network, which opened on 13 May 2006. The tramway now consists of three tram lines and one tram-train line.

 Line 2 from Nouveau Bassin to Coteaux
 Line 1 from Gare Centrale to Châtaignier
 Line 3 from Gare Centrale to Lutterbach
 Tram-train line from Gare Centrale to Thann via Lutterbach

Road
Motorway A36 is the main axis connecting the city with the west of the country, to cities such as Dijon, Paris and Lyon. The A35 is the main north–south axis, connecting cities such as Strasbourg and Basel.

Sports 
Mulhouse is one of the nation's hubs for women's volleyball. ASPTT Mulhouse won multiple titles at the National level. The team plays its home games at the Palais des Sports.

People
Mulhouse was the birthplace of:
 Maurice Achener (1881–1963), French illustrator, painter, and print maker
 Jean de Beaugrand (1584–1640), lineographer and mathematician
  (born 1955), composer and synthesist
 Bernard Bloch (born 1949), actor and director
 Samir Bourouina (born 1978), professional footballer
 Jean Brenner (1937–2009), painter
 Karl Brandt (1904–1948), German Nazi personal physician to Adolf Hitler and head administrator of the T-4 Euthanasia Program, executed for war crimes
 David Cage (born 1969), French video game designer, writer and musician. Born in Mulhouse, Cage was the first game developer to receive the Legion of Honour, the highest decoration granted in France.
 Pierre Chambon (born 1931), biologist
 Cléopatre Darleux (born 1989), handball goalkeeper
 Mireille Delunsch (born 1962), soprano
 Tom Dillmann (born 1989), racing driver
 Artur Dinter (1876–1948), writer and Nazi politician
 Dorian Diring (born 1992), footballer
 Adrien Dollfus (1858–1921), French zoologist and carcinologist
 Jean Dollfus (1800–1887), French industrialist 
 Jean Dorst (1924–2001), ornithologist
 Alfred Dreyfus (1859–1935), French military officer best known for being the focus of the Dreyfus affair
 Huguette Dreyfus (1928–2016), harpsichordist
 Léon Ehrhart (1854–1875), composer
 Yann Ehrlacher (born 1996), racing driver
 Nusch Éluard (1906–1946), performer, model and surrealist artist
 François Florent (born François Eichholtzer, 1937), actor, founder of the Cours Florent
 Georges Friedel (1865–1933), mineralogist, son of Charles Friedel
 Charles Frédéric Girard (1822–1895), biologist specializing on ichthyology and herpetology
 Jean-Gaspard Heilmann (1718–1760), painter
  (1822–1859), photographer
  (1898–1964), diplomat
 Daniel Jelensperger (1799–1831), musicologist
 Katia and Maurice Krafft, volcanologists
 Johann Heinrich Lambert (1728–1777), mathematician, physicist and astronomer
 Joffrey Lauvergne (born 1991), basketball player
 Friedrich Wilhelm Levi (1888–1966), mathematician
 François Loeser (born 1958), mathematician
 Paul Meyer (born 1965), clarinetist
 Hervé Milazzo (born 1975), professional footballer
 Véronique North-Minca (born 1953), diplomat
 Thierry Omeyer (born 1976), handball goalkeeper
 Marc Pfertzel (born 1981), football player
 Rémy Pflimlin (1954–2016), CEO of France Télévisions from 2010 to 2015
 Pierre Probst (1913–2007), comic and children book artist
 Napoléon Henri Reber (1807–1880), composer
 Claire Roman (1906–1941), French Air Force pilot in World War II
 Daniel Roth (born 1942), organist, composer and pedagogue
 Franz Eugen Schlachter (1859–1911), revivalist preacher, classical scholar, and translator of the Schlachter Bible
 Christiane Scrivener (born 1925), EU-Commissioner
 Daniel Schlumberger (1904–1972), archaeologist and professor of Near Eastern Archaeology at the University of Strasbourg and later Princeton University
  (born 1953), writer
 Jean Schlumberger (1907–1987), jewelry designer at Tiffany & Co
 René Schützenberger (1860–1916), painter
 Jules Siegfried born Mulhouse in 1837, industrialist and politician, French Minister of Commerce 1892-3
 Rémy Stricker (1936–2019), musicologist
 Frank Ténot (1925–2004), press agent, pataphysician and jazz critic
 Philippe Tondre (born 1989), oboist
 Vitaa (born 1983), singer
 Pierre Weiss (1865–1940), physicist
 Alfred Werner (1866–1919), Nobel Prize in Chemistry 1913
 Jules Auguste Wiernsberger (1857–1925), composer and conductor
  (1887–1951), photographer
 Robert Wyler (1900–1971), film producer
 William Wyler (1902–1981), award-winning motion picture director
 Jean-Marc Savelli (born at Mulhouse in 1955), a virtuoso concert pianist
 Antar Yahia (born 1982), football player
 Georges Zipélius (1808–1890), illustrator

Other residents include:

 Adolphe Braun (1812–1877), photographer
 Alfred de Glehn (1848–1936), designer of steam locomotives
 Armando Thiriet Koenig (1882–1956), industrial engineer, Director of AEG Madrid in 1919, established an AEG subsidiary in Seville in the early 1920s

Twin towns—sister cities

Mulhouse is twinned with:

 Walsall, England, since 1953
 Antwerp, Belgium, since 1956
 Kassel, Germany, since 1965
 Bergamo, Italy, since 1989
 Chemnitz, Germany, since 1990
 Giv'atayim, Israel, since 1991
 Timișoara, Romania, since 1991
 Jining, China, since 1996

References

Bibliography

External links

  
 Official website of the Tourist Office of Mulhouse and its region
 Official website of the Convention Bureau of Mulhouse and its region 
 The Mulhousian Ferret: High Resolution Video Guide of Mulhouse 
 MulhouseBienvenue.com City Guide Town of Mulhouse 
 Museum of Printed Textiles
 TramTrain website 

 
Cities in France
Communes of Haut-Rhin
Décapole
Associates of the Old Swiss Confederacy
Free imperial cities
Subprefectures in France